A Clean Breast is film director Russ Meyer's self-published three volume autobiography.

Written under the pen name "Adolph Schwartz" and published by a company named "Hauck", for Meyer's late mother's maiden name, it was published in August 2000 after fifteen years of delays and rewrites. Many Meyer fans had pre-paid for the book as early as 1990. It is an immense 18-pound, 3-volume set of luxurious 100-lb paper stock, with sewn signatures and thousands of photos.

Volumes
Volumes 1 and 2 provide the core of Russ Meyer's autobiography, beginning with his childhood and progressing to lengthy and fascinating recollections of his time during World War II as a combat cameraman for the 166th Signal Photo Company. He writes of risking his life and making lifelong friends as his unit traveled across Europe with George S. Patton. Meyer's World War II buddies are invoked often along with the world of independent filmmaking and his ribald life of women and sex.

Volume 3 is composed mainly of detailed retellings of Meyer's films, richly illustrated with countless sequential images presented in film frames. Volume 3 also brings the reader up to date on Meyer's latter-day video (and other) activities with Pandora Peaks.

References

2000 non-fiction books
American autobiographies
World War II memoirs